Mark Derr is an American dog writer who has published books on dogs, as well as the social and environmental developments of Florida. Born in Baltimore, Maryland, Derr was educated at Johns Hopkins. He lives with his wife Gina Maranto in Charlottesville, Virginia.

Publications
His books include:
Over Florida New York: Mallard Press, 1992. (Mark Derr and Cameron Davidson)
The frontiersman: the real life and the many legends of Davy Crockett, New York: W. Morrow, 1993
A dog's history of America: how our best friend explored, conquered, and settled a continent. New York: North Point Press, 2004.
Dog's best friend: annals of the dog-human relationship. New York: H. Holt and Co., 1997.
Some kind of paradise: a chronicle of man and the land in Florida	New York: W. Morrow, 1989.
How the dog became the dog: From wolves to our best friends Overlook Duckworth United States and United Kingdom, 2011.

References

Living people
Year of birth missing (living people)
American male journalists
American non-fiction environmental writers
Writers from Florida
Johns Hopkins University alumni
Writers from Baltimore